Chad Spann (born August 4, 1988) is a former American football running back. He was signed by the Indianapolis Colts as an undrafted free agent in 2011. He played college football at Northern Illinois University.

In 2010, as a college senior, he rushed for 1,388 yards, led the nation with 22 rushing touchdowns, and contributed to the Huskies first 11-win season.

Early years
Spann attended North Central High School in Indianapolis, where he was a first-team all-state selection his senior season.  He holds the school single-season and career rushing yardage and touchdown records.

College career
As a college player, Spann established a new single-season touchdown record for Northern Illinois. Spann received the Vern Smith Leadership Award given by the Mid-American Conference.

College highlights
2010 Vern Smith Leadership Award Winner
2010 MAC Offensive Player of the Year
2x 1st Team All MAC
Back to Back 1000 yd seasons
Led nation in rushing TDs (2010)
Second on NIU's all-time list for career rushing touchdowns
Walter Camp Foundation National Player of the Week (9/25)

College statistics

Professional career

Indianapolis Colts
On July 29, 2011, he signed with the Indianapolis Colts as an undrafted free agent. On September 4, 2011, he was placed on injured reserve due to a hamstring injury. On September 6, 2011, he received an injury settlement.

Tampa Bay Buccaneers
On October 18, 2011, he signed with the Tampa Bay Buccaneers to join the practice squad. On November 7, 2011, he was released from the practice squad.

Pittsburgh Steelers
On January 4, 2012, he signed with the Pittsburgh Steelers. On January 8, 2012, he played in the Steelers' playoff loss to the Denver Broncos. On May 2, 2012, he was released.

New York Jets
Spann was signed by the New York Jets on July 27, 2013. He was released on August 26, 2013.

Houston Texans
On December 10, 2013, Spann signed with the Houston Texans. He played in one game for the Texans. He was released on May 15, 2014.

Saskatchewan Roughriders
Spann was signed to the Saskatchewan Roughriders' practice roster on September 9, 2015. He was promoted to the active roster on October 23. He played in one game for the Roughriders in 2015, rushing twice for 17 yards. He suffered a torn Achilles while with the Roughriders. He was released by the team on December 15, 2015.

See also
 List of college football yearly rushing leaders

References

External links
Northern Illinois Huskies football bio

1988 births
Living people
African-American players of American football
African-American players of Canadian football
American football running backs
Canadian football running backs
Houston Texans players
Indianapolis Colts players
New York Jets players
Northern Illinois Huskies football players
Pittsburgh Steelers players
Players of American football from Indianapolis
Saskatchewan Roughriders players
Players of Canadian football from Indianapolis
Tampa Bay Buccaneers players